Langor Township is a township in Beltrami County, Minnesota, United States. The population was 186 as of the 2000 census.

Langor Township was named for Henry A. Langord, an early settler and native of Norway.

Geography

Unincorporated towns
 Langor at 
(This list is based on USGS data and may include former settlements.)

Major highway
  Minnesota State Highway 72

Lakes
 Smith Lake (north edge)

Adjacent townships
 Cormant Township (north)
 Shooks Township (northeast)
 Hornet Township (east)
 Summit Township (southeast)
 Hines Township (south)
 Hagali Township (southwest)
 O'Brien Township (west)
 Quiring Township (northwest)

Cemeteries
The township contains Langor Cemetery.

Demographics
As of the census of 2000, there were 186 people, 68 households, and 51 families residing in the township.  The population density was 5.1 people per square mile (2.0/km2).  There were 85 housing units at an average density of 2.4/sq mi (0.9/km2).  The racial makeup of the township was 98.92% White, 0.54% Native American, and 0.54% from two or more races.

There were 68 households, out of which 42.6% had children under the age of 18 living with them, 63.2% were married couples living together, 1.5% had a female householder with no husband present, and 25.0% were non-families. 25.0% of all households were made up of individuals, and 11.8% had someone living alone who was 65 years of age or older.  The average household size was 2.74 and the average family size was 3.20.

In the township the population was spread out, with 31.2% under the age of 18, 7.5% from 18 to 24, 26.3% from 25 to 44, 24.2% from 45 to 64, and 10.8% who were 65 years of age or older.  The median age was 36 years. For every 100 females, there were 129.6 males.  For every 100 females age 18 and over, there were 128.6 males.

The median income for a household in the township was $41,000, and the median income for a family was $48,125. Males had a median income of $24,583 versus $17,143 for females. The per capita income for the township was $17,662.  None of the families and 3.8% of the population were living below the poverty line.

References
 United States National Atlas
 United States Census Bureau 2007 TIGER/Line Shapefiles
 United States Board on Geographic Names (GNIS)

Townships in Beltrami County, Minnesota
Townships in Minnesota